The 2022 CAF Women's Champions League COSAFA Qualifiers, commonly known as the 2022 COSAFA Women's Champions League (occasionally known as the 2022 Hollywoodbets COSAFA Women's Champions League for sponsorship purposes), was the 2nd edition of the annual women's association football club championship organized by COSAFA for the women's clubs of member associations. It took place in South Africa for the second straight year from 7 to 13 August having been originally scheduled from 4 to 14 August.

Mamelodi Sundowns Ladies FC were the defending champions but got defeated and succeeded by Green Buffaloes 6-5 on penalties following a goalless draw after 120 minutes.

Participating teams
The following 6 teams took part in this tournament:

Venue
Th tournament was held entirely at the Sugar Ray Xulu Stadium in Durban, South Africa.

Match officials

Draw
The draw for this edition of the tournament was held on 20 July 2022 at 11:00 UTC (13:00 CAT) in Morocco. The six teams were drawn into 2 group of 3 teams with teams finishing first and second in the groups qualifying for the knockout stages. The resultant groups are as follows:

Group stage

Tiebreakers
Teams were ranked according to points (3 points for a win, 1 point for a draw, 0 points for a loss), and if tied on points, the following tiebreaking criteria are applied, in the order given, to determine the rankings.
Points in head-to-head matches among tied teams;
Goal difference in head-to-head matches among tied teams;
Goals scored in head-to-head matches among tied teams;
If more than two teams are tied, and after applying all head-to-head criteria above, a subset of teams are still tied, all head-to-head criteria above are reapplied exclusively to this subset of teams;
Goal difference in all group matches;
Goals scored in all group matches;
Penalty shoot-out if only two teams are tied meet in the last group stage round;
Disciplinary points (yellow card = 1 point, red card as a result of two yellow cards = 3 points, direct red card = 3 points, yellow card followed by direct red card = 4 points);
Drawing of lots.

All times are South African Standard Time (UTC+2).

Group 1

Group 2

Knockout stage

Third place

Final
The winners would qualify for the 2022 CAF Women's Champions League as COSAFA representatives.

Statistics

Goalscorers

Own goals

Awards 
The CAF Women's Champions League COSAFA Qualifiers technical study group selected the following as the best of the tournament.

Squad of the tournament
The CAF Women's Champions League COSAFA Qualifiers technical study group selected the following 11 players as the squad of the tournament.

Best XI

References

2022 CAF Women's Champions League
2022 in African football
2022 in women's association football